Al Wahadinah (الوهادنه), Khirbet Mar Elias or Khirbet al Wahadneh is a village in the Ajloun Governorate, Jordan. Along with Al Hashimiyya and Halawah, it makes up the Ash Shefa Municipality. It has a large Christian population and contains both a Catholic and an Eastern Orthodox church.

The village is on a slight hill overlooking the windswept olive groves of Ajloun, in the valley of the Yarmuk River and is an important site in early Christianity. It is also the home town of Elijah. The village also boasts Tel Mar Elias, one of the largest Byzantine churches in Jordan and an ancient site of pilgrimage, worship and interfaith coexistence.

History

Ottoman era
It had a population of 32  households and 3 bachelors; all Muslim. They paid a fixed tax-rate of 25%  on various  agricultural products, including wheat, barley, olive trees/vineyards/fruit trees, goats and beehives, in addition to  occasional revenues; a total of  20,000 akçe.

Modern era
The Jordanian census of 1961 found 1,096 inhabitants in Kh. Wahadina, of whom 350 were Christians.

See also
Christianity in the 1st century
Jewish Christian
Jerusalem in Christianity, Apostolic Age
Christianity in Turkey
Jerusalem
Early Christians

References

Bibliography

External links
 Satellite Images of Al Wahadinah

Populated places in Ajloun Governorate